Vivalda is both a surname and a given name. Notable people with the name include:

Lorenzo Vivalda (1890–1945), Italian general
Yohann Vivalda (born 1988), French rugby union player
Vivalda Dula, Angolan singer-songwriter and percussionist

Feminine given names